Nursery Road station is a Baltimore Light Rail station in Pumphrey, Maryland. There are 37 free parking spaces and connections can be made to MTA Maryland's Route 17 bus from here.

Though officially located at 6825 Baltimore-Annapolis Boulevard (MD 648) the actual location of the Nursery Road stop is at the corner of Nursery Road and South Old Annapolis Road. Nursery Road is designated Maryland Route 168 west of Baltimore & Annapolis Boulevard, and a local street east of Route 648.

Station layout

See also
 Washington, Baltimore and Annapolis Electric Railway (1908–1935) - Pumphrey Station
 Baltimore and Annapolis Railroad (1887–1980) - Pumphrey Station

References

External links
Schedules
Nursery Road Light Rail Stop on Google Street View

Baltimore Light Rail stations
Railway stations in the United States opened in 1992
1992 establishments in Maryland
Railway stations in Anne Arundel County, Maryland